Omalodera dentimaculata is a species of beetle in the family Carabidae, the only species in the genus Omalodera.

References

Trechinae